Oktyabrsky is a rural locality (a village) in Kirzinsky Selsoviet, Karaidelsky District, Bashkortostan, Russia. The population was 1 as of 2010. There are 2 streets.

Geography 
Oktyabrsky is located 44 km southwest of Karaidel (the district's administrative centre) by road. Chebykovo is the nearest rural locality.

References 

Rural localities in Karaidelsky District